= Gil Zussman =

Israeli electrical engineer

- Born: Israel
- Education: BSc, Industrial Engineering and Management, BA, Economics, 1995, PhD, Electrical Engineering, 2004, Technion – Israel Institute of Technology; MSc, Operations Research, 1999, Tel-Aviv University
- Scientific career
- Institutions: Columbia University
- Thesis: Energy Efficient Routing and Bandwidth Allocation in Wireless Personal Area Networks (2004)
- Doctoral advisor: Adrian Segall

Gil Zussman is an Israeli electrical engineer. He is the Kenneth Brayer Professor of Electrical Engineering at Columbia University. Zussman is a Fellow of the Institute of Electrical and Electronics Engineers.

== Early life and education ==
Zussman served as an engineer in the Israel Defense Forces from 1995 to 1998. While serving, he earned his Bachelor of Science degree in Industrial Engineering and Management and his Bachelor of Arts degree in Economics from the Technion – Israel Institute of Technology. He then earned his Master's degree in Operations Research from Tel-Aviv University in 1999 before returning to Technion for his PhD in 2004. Following his PhD, Zussman accepted a postdoctoral fellowship at Massachusetts Institute of Technology's Communications and Networking Research Group from 2004 to 2007.

== Academic career ==
Zussman joined Columbia University's Department of Electrical Engineering as an assistant professor in 2007. During his tenure at Columbia, Zussman became the director of the Wireless and Mobile Networking (WiMNet) Laboratory and collaborated with the Energy Harvesting Active Networked Tags (EnHANTs) Project. In these roles, he focuses on the processing, integration, and application of thin-film electronics. Zussman also helps with the design and deployment of the Platforms for Advanced Wireless Research COSMOS testbed in West Harlem to support experimentation with ultra-high bandwidth and ultra-low latency. In 2018, he established an annual NSF COSMOS/EFRI program for teachers from New York City public schools to learn about the real-world application of science and engineering. A few years later, he began collaborating with colleagues at Columbia to use machine learning to help optimize traffic flows in New York City. This project received the 2023 IDC Smart Cities North America Award.

In 2021, Zussman was elected a Fellow of the Institute of Electrical and Electronics Engineers for his "contributions to thin-film electronics for displays and sensors." The following year, he received the Janette and Armen Avanessians Diversity Award for encouraging "women and men from diverse backgrounds to become part of the academic community of engineering education." In 2025, Zussman was appointed the Kenneth Brayer Professor of Electrical Engineering.
